Martin Hochertz (October 21, 1968 – March 30, 2022) was an American professional football player who was a defensive end in the Arena Football League for the Florida Bobcats and New Jersey Red Dogs. He played college football at the Southern Illinois University.

References

1968 births
2022 deaths
People from Cary, Illinois
Players of American football from Illinois
American football defensive ends
Southern Illinois Salukis football players
Atlanta Falcons players
Washington Redskins players
Miami Dolphins players
Florida Bobcats players
New Jersey Red Dogs players